That Night! is a 1957 American drama film directed by John Newland and written by Jack Rowles and Robert Wallace. The film stars John Beal, Augusta Dabney, Shepperd Strudwick, Rosemary Murphy and Malcolm Brodrick. The film was released on August 22, 1957 by Universal-International.

The film was nominated for the BAFTA Award for Best Film, won that year by The Bridge on the River Kwai, as well as a BAFTA Award for Best Actress in a Leading Role nomination for Dabney.

Plot

Chris Bowden works at a New York City agency, writing commercials for television, and commutes to his Connecticut home daily on the train. One day, late for his daughter's birthday, Chris suffers a heart attack while aboard the train. An unscheduled stop is made to rush him to a hospital.

Although he is in his early 40s, Chris becomes concerned that his life could be near an end, particularly after a second attack. His wife Maggie also reevaluates her life, wondering if the stress of a marriage and work has led to this development. Each vows to reconsider what's important to them after Chris is finally released to come home.

Cast 

John Beal as Commuter Christopher J. Bowden
Augusta Dabney as Wife Maggie Bowden
Shepperd Strudwick as Dr. Bernard Fischer
Rosemary Murphy as Nurse 'Chorny' Chornis
Malcolm Brodrick as Tommy Bowden
Dennis Kohler as Chrissie Bowden
Beverly Lunsford as Betsy Bowden
Bill Darrid as Dr. Perroni
Joseph Julian as Mr. Rosalie 
Staats Cotsworth as Salesman
Peg Hillias as Doctor
John McGovern as Ward Neighbor
Mercer McLeod as Resident Doctor
Vera Allen as Ward Nurse
Floyd Ennis as Orderly
Fran Bennett as Attendant
Ray Doyle as Policeman
Jackson Beck as Man on Train
Leora Thatcher as Woman on Train
Humphrey Davis as Conductor
John Raby as Brakeman
Sam Grey as Film Cutter
Karl Swenson as McAdam
Ann Loring as Mrs. McAdam

References

External links 
 

1957 films
American black-and-white films
RKO Pictures films
1957 drama films
American drama films
Films scored by Mario Nascimbene
Films directed by John Newland
1950s English-language films
1950s American films